Ross, Skye and Inverness West may refer to: 

 Ross, Skye and Inverness West (UK Parliament constituency), a former constituency of the House of Commons of the Parliament of the United Kingdom
 Ross, Skye and Inverness West (Scottish Parliament constituency), a former constituency of the Scottish Parliament

See also
 Ross, Skye and Lochaber (UK Parliament constituency), a constituency of the House of Commons of the Parliament of the United Kingdom